John Donald Fuqua (born August 20, 1933) is a former U.S. Democratic politician.

Early years and Education
Don Fuqua was born in Jacksonville, Duval County, Florida in 1933. Fuqua attended the University of Florida at Gainesville from 1951 to 1953. After serving in the Korean war, he returned to the university to graduate in 1957. Fuqua served in the Florida House of Representatives from 1958 to 1962.

Politics
He was elected as a Democrat to the United States House of Representatives from Florida and served from January 3, 1963, to January 3, 1987. Fuqua was chairman of the House Science and Technology Committee.

Personal information
Fuqua served in Korea with the United States Army Medical Corps during and after the Korean War. During most of his congressional career, Fuqua maintained his legal residence on a farm near Altha in Calhoun County, Florida, where he became a seasoned dairy farmer. He currently resides in Gainesville, Florida.

References

External links

 

1933 births
Farmers from Florida
Living people
Democratic Party members of the Florida House of Representatives
Military personnel from Florida
People from Calhoun County, Florida
Democratic Party members of the United States House of Representatives from Florida
Politicians from Jacksonville, Florida
People from St. Augustine, Florida
University of Florida alumni